Hagai Amir (born 1968) is the brother and accomplice of Yigal Amir, the assassin of Yitzhak Rabin.

Biography
Hagai Amir was convicted for conspiracy to murder Yitzhak Rabin and planning attacks against Palestinians, as well as for various weapons charges.

On 27 April 2006, he was convicted for threatening to have then-Israeli Prime Minister Ariel Sharon killed. Following a trial before the Netanya Magistrates' Court, he was sentenced to a year in prison, of which half a year was to be added to his current prison term.

Hagai served his sentence at Ayalon Prison in Ramla. On 4 May 2012, he was released from prison. Since his release from prison, Hagai has been living with his parents, while studying engineering and running his own welding company.

References

1968 births
Living people
Assassination of Yitzhak Rabin
21st-century Israeli criminals
20th-century Israeli Jews
Israeli Orthodox Jews
Israeli people of Yemeni-Jewish descent
Israeli prisoners and detainees
Prisoners and detainees of Israel